Lehmja is a village in Rae Parish, Harju County, in northern Estonia. It has a population of 37 (as of 1 January 2010).

Kalev confectionery factory is located in Lehmja village.

Population

See also
 Lehmja Manor

References

Villages in Harju County